The 2002 Rhein Fire season was the eighth season for the team in the NFL Europe League (NFLEL). The team was led by head coach Pete Kuharchek in his second year, and played its home games at Rheinstadion in Düsseldorf, Germany. They finished the regular season in first place with a record of seven wins and three losses. In World Bowl X, Rhein lost to the Berlin Thunder 26–20.

Offseason

Free agent draft

Personnel

Staff

Roster

Standings

Game summaries

Week 1: at Amsterdam Admirals

World Bowl X

References

Rhein
Rhein Fire seasons
Rhein
Rhein